Methyprylon, or Noludar, is a sedative of the piperidinedione derivative family first developed by Hoffmann-La Roche.
This medicine was used for treating insomnia, but is now rarely used as it has been replaced by newer drugs with fewer side effects, such as benzodiazepines.

Methyprylon was withdrawn from the US market in June 1975 and the Canadian market in September 1990.
Some other trade names are Noctan and Dimerin.

Adverse effects
Side effects can include skin rash, fever, depression, ulcers or sores in mouth or throat, unusual bleeding or bruising, confusion, fast heartbeat, respiratory depression, swelling of feet or lower legs, dizziness, drowsiness, headache, double vision, clumsiness, constipation, diarrhea, nausea, vomiting, unusual weakness.

Pharmacokinetics
A study of single oral doses of 300 mg in healthy volunteers found that the zero-order absorption model fit the data best. Mean (+/- SD) values for the half-life (9.2 +/- 2.2 h), apparent clearance, (11.91 +/- 4.42 mL/h/kg) and apparent steady-state volume of distribution, (0.97 +/- 0.33 L/kg) were found.

A case report found that the pharmacokinetics of methyprylon were not concentration dependent in an overdose case; explanations included saturation or inhibition of metabolic pathways. The generally accepted half-life for a therapeutic dose was not found appropriate in intoxicated patients and would underestimate the time required to reach a safe concentration of the drug.

See also 

Pyrithyldione
Piperidione
Bemegride
Thalidomide
Glutethimide
Phenglutarimide
Ethchlorvynol

References 

2-Piperidinones
4-Piperidinones
GABAA receptor positive allosteric modulators